Joseph Maguire could refer to: 

Joseph Maguire (born 1952), American military and intelligence official
Joseph Francis Maguire (1919–2014), American Roman Catholic bishop
Joe Maguire (born 1996), English footballer
Joey McGuire (born 1970), American football coach

See also
 Inspector Joseph Meguire, fictional character in the manga series Detective Conan